Coronado Railroad was a  railroad which operated in a copper mining region of eastern Arizona.

The Coronado Railroad was one of the first railroads in Arizona, constructed by Henry Lesinsky in 1879 along Chase Creek, between mines and a smelter. Eventually the line connected mines via seven funicular railways and many miles of track. The mines and the railway were connected in ownership, and the railroad was not separately incorporated or a common carrier. Cars used were 4-wheelmine cars and flatcars.

The railroad operated as an isolated line until 1883 when a  gauge line reached Clifton to form an interchange with the Coronado. Its former  gauge equipment was used to widen the  line from Clifton to Shannon by 1903. This new  gauge line was incorporated as the Coronado Railroad.

Steam locomotives of the  gauge system continued to operate, even after expansion of electric mine railways which captured a significant portion of the ore movement.

Several  gauge locomotives and cars from the Coronado Railroad and associated copper mining companies survived into preservation. The locomotive "Rattlesnake" was purchased by an old engineer and maintained as a display. Three other locomotives were left abandoned on a hilltop until 1990, when they were removed over very steep terrain by dropping down a loaded truck reinforced with a cable attached to a bulldozer.

The Coronado Railroad was one of the smallest minimum gauge railroads that operated in North America.

References 
 Hilton, George W.: American Narrow Gauge Railroads, p. 311. Stanford University Press, 1990. 
 Eppinga, Jane: "Meshpoca: The Stories of A Great Pioneer Family of the Frontier: The Lesinsky Family of Southeastern Arizona" Southwest Jewish History, Volume 2, Number 3, Spring 1994.

External links 
 Surviving Coronado Steam Locomotives

 
Narrow gauge railroads in Arizona
1879 in rail transport